Guillaume Raineau (born 29 June 1986 in Nantes) is a French rower. He finished 4th in the men's lightweight coxless four at the 2008 Summer Olympics

References
 
 

1986 births
Living people
French male rowers
Sportspeople from Nantes
Olympic rowers of France
Rowers at the 2008 Summer Olympics
Rowers at the 2016 Summer Olympics
World Rowing Championships medalists for France
Olympic bronze medalists for France
Olympic medalists in rowing
Medalists at the 2016 Summer Olympics